This is a list of churches in the Swedish province of Uppland. The list does not include chapels or church ruins. Churches in Stockholm municipality are listed in a separate list.

Note: in the list, "Year" denotes the year construction of the church was finished, when it was inaugurated, or the main construction period of the church.

The list

References

Sweden religion-related lists
Buildings and structures in Stockholm County
Buildings and structures in Uppsala County
Uppland